Rafael António Figueiredo Ramos (born 9 January 1995) is a Portuguese professional footballer who plays as a full back for Brazilian club Corinthians.

Formed at Sporting and Benfica, he spent his early professional career in the United States with Orlando City and Chicago Fire in Major League Soccer. After winning the Dutch Eerste Divisie with Twente in 2019, he spent three years in the Primeira Liga with Santa Clara before joining Corinthians.

Club career

Early years
Born in Santa Marinha, Seia, Guarda District, Ramos started out his career with Sporting CP before being released in 2012. He then joined Real S.C. for one year before moving to S.L. Benfica's youth system in 2013, where he joined the under-19 squad. He was part of the squad that competed in the 2013–14 UEFA Youth League. On 5 May 2014, Ramos signed a contract to stay with Benfica until 2020.

Orlando City

On 8 July 2014, Ramos and Benfica teammate Estrela were transferred to Orlando City SC of the USL Pro, the third level of the United States soccer league system, on 3-year professional contracts as part of an affiliation between the two clubs. The contracts would include the remainder of the 2014 USL Pro season before the team joined Major League Soccer in 2015.   The pair made their professional debuts on 23 August against Richmond Kickers, in which Ramos scored a 70th-minute winner in a 3–2 away victory. Head coach Adrian Heath said of them after the game, "I thought that the two new players (Estrela and Ramos) were outstanding, considering that they haven't played for two or three weeks. Their contribution was massive..."

Ramos played in Orlando's first MLS game on 8 March 2015, a 1–1 home draw with fellow expansion team New York City FC. He was sent off twice over the season, for a foul on Waylon Francis in a 3–0 loss at Columbus Crew on 19 April, and a 36th-minute challenge on Justin Morrow in a 5–0 loss at Toronto FC on 22 August. He totalled 39 MLS appearances for Orlando and assisted five goals. On 4 June 2017, making his first start of the season and only his third in the past 12 months due to hamstring injuries, he lasted 26 minutes before another red card in a goalless draw with Chicago Fire SC at the Citrus Bowl.

Chicago Fire
On 18 January 2018, Ramos was traded to Chicago Fire in exchange for the rights to Cameron Lindley and $100,000 of Targeted Allocation Money. He made his debut on 17 March in a 2–1 loss at Minnesota United FC, one of only five games during his time in Illinois, three in the league and two in the U.S. Open Cup.

Twente
On 6 August 2018, Chicago and Ramos mutually agreed to part ways. Later that day, Dutch team FC Twente signed him on a one-year contract with the option of a second. He helped the team win the 2018–19 Eerste Divisie title and promotion back to the Eredivisie.

Santa Clara
On 2 July 2019, Ramos returned to his native Portugal to sign with C.D. Santa Clara of the Primeira Liga.

Corinthians
On 12 April 2022, Ramos went to Brazil to sign a two-year deal with Sport Club Corinthians Paulista, under compatriot manager Vítor Pereira. He made his debut in the Campeonato Brasileiro Série A four days later, starting in a 3–0 home win over Avaí FC and being praised by the coach.

Personal life
Ramos holds a U.S. green card which qualified him as a domestic player for MLS roster purposes.

Honours
Benfica
UEFA Youth League: Runner-up 2013–14

 FC Twente
Eerste Divisie: Champions 2018–19

References

External links

 
 
 
 National team data 
 

1995 births
Living people
People from Seia
Sportspeople from Guarda District
Portuguese footballers
Association football defenders
S.L. Benfica footballers
Orlando City SC (2010–2014) players
Orlando City SC players
Orlando City B players
Chicago Fire FC players
FC Twente players
C.D. Santa Clara players
Sport Club Corinthians Paulista players
USL Championship players
Major League Soccer players
Eerste Divisie players
Primeira Liga players
Campeonato Brasileiro Série A players
Portuguese expatriate footballers
Expatriate footballers in the Netherlands
Expatriate soccer players in the United States
Expatriate footballers in Brazil
Portuguese expatriate sportspeople in the Netherlands
Portuguese expatriate sportspeople in the United States
Portuguese expatriate sportspeople in Brazil
Portugal youth international footballers